Samararatne V. A. Dharmasena (28 September 1950 – 16 February 2007) was a Sri Lankan sprinter. He competed in the men's 4 × 400 metres relay at the 1980 Summer Olympics.

References

External links
 

1950 births
2007 deaths
Athletes (track and field) at the 1980 Summer Olympics
Sri Lankan male sprinters
Olympic athletes of Sri Lanka
Sportspeople from Kandy